The Alara Castle, is a historic fortification located at Alanya district of Antalya Province in southern Turkey.

The castle was built under the Byzantine Empire, and in the 11th century became the western outpost of the Armenian Kingdom of Cilicia (1080-1375). The castle incorporates a citadel inside the outer walls. The castle's inside is reached by some 180-step stairway, which is tunneled in the rock. Around the middle of the stairway, a deepening opens to a cistern. In the citadel, a palace, accommodation facilities for the garrison, a mosque and a bath are among the  ruins.

Situated atop a steep massive rock at the east bank of Alara River, the castle was hard to win. The lord of the castle gave it however up in 1231 as he realized that Seljuk Sultan of Rum Alaeddin Keykubad I (reigned 1220–1237) had conquered Alanya.

The regional government of Antalya considered in 2011 the restoration of Alara Castle and its subsequent opening to the public as a place of interest.

References

External links
 

Ruined castles in Turkey
Alanya
Byzantine fortifications in Turkey
Buildings and structures completed in the 13th century
Buildings and structures in Antalya Province
Armenian Kingdom of Cilicia
Castles in Antalya Province